Mechanic Township is one of the fourteen townships of Holmes County, Ohio, United States. As of the 2010 census the population was 3,127, up from 2,652 in 2000.

Geography
Located in the southern part of the county, it borders the following townships:
Berlin Township - northeast
Clark Township - east
Crawford Township, Coshocton County - southeast corner
Mill Creek Township, Coshocton County - south
Clark Township, Coshocton County - southwest
Killbuck Township - west
Hardy Township - northwest

No municipalities are located in Mechanic Township.

Name and history
It is the only Mechanic Township statewide.

Government
The township is governed by a three-member board of trustees, who are elected in November of odd-numbered years to a four-year term beginning on the following January 1. Two are elected in the year after the presidential election and one is elected in the year before it. There is also an elected township fiscal officer, who serves a four-year term beginning on April 1 of the year after the election, which is held in November of the year before the presidential election. Vacancies in the fiscal officership or on the board of trustees are filled by the remaining trustees.

References

External links
County website

Townships in Holmes County, Ohio
Townships in Ohio